Leather Stocking is a 1909 American silent short drama film directed by D. W. Griffith. adapted from James Fenimore Cooper's 1826 novel The Last of the Mohicans.

Cast
 George Nichols as colonel
 Mack Sennett
 Marion Leonard as colonel's Nieces
 Linda Arvidson as colonel's Nieces
 Owen Moore

References

External links
 

1909 films
1909 drama films
Silent American drama films
American silent short films
American black-and-white films
Films directed by D. W. Griffith
1909 short films
Films based on The Last of the Mohicans
1900s American films